Taman Division may refer to units Soviet Army with the honorific of "Taman":

 2nd Guards Motor Rifle Division
 32nd Guards Motor Rifle Division
60th Missile Division, 27th Guards Rocket Army
74th Rifle Division
 89th Rifle Division (Soviet Union)

See also 

 Red Army